The Adventures of Aggie is a black-and-white sitcom starring Joan Shawlee that was made by ME Films and broadcast on ITV.

It lasted for one series of twenty-six episodes. Also being aimed at the American market, it was broadcast in the US from December 1957 under the name Aggie. It was written by Martin Stern and Ernest Borneman.

Three episodes of the television show were released as a TV movie entitled Born for Trouble.

Several episodes were directed by John Guillermin.

Cast
Joan Shawlee - Aasgard Agnette Anderson

Plot
Aggie Anderson was an American working in London as a fashion buyer for an international company. Her job required her to travel often, and when abroad she often got into various troubles and accidents. These situations were often dangerous, and would involve spies and criminals.

Guest Cast
Many of the actors who made guest appearances in episodes would later gain a higher profile, these include Patrick Allen,  Stephen Boyd, Dick Emery, Edward Mulhare, Christopher Lee, Patrick McGoohan, John Schlesinger and Anthony Valentine.

References

External links

1956 British television series debuts
1957 British television series endings
1950s British sitcoms
ITV sitcoms